Charles Julien Fanneau de Lahorie (1758–1822) was a French sailor. He was awarded the Knight of the Royal and Military Order of Saint Louis. He died in Cayenne at the age of 63.

References

1758 births
1822 deaths
French military personnel
French people of the American Revolution
French sailors
Order of Saint Louis recipients
People from Mayenne
Place of birth missing
Place of death missing